Sue Olsen is a former provincial level politician from Alberta, Canada. She served as a member of the Legislative Assembly of Alberta from 1997 until 2001.

Political career
Olsen was elected to the Alberta Legislature in the 1997 Alberta general election. She defeated incumbent Andrew Beniuk to win her only term in office.

Olsen resigned her seat in the Alberta Legislature to run for a seat in the House of Commons of Canada in the electoral district of Edmonton Centre-East as a federal Liberal candidate in the 2000 federal election. The election was closely contested but, Olsen lost by 3000 votes to incumbent Member of Parliament Peter Goldring.

References

External links
Legislative Assembly of Alberta Members Listing

Alberta Liberal Party MLAs
Living people
Candidates in the 2000 Canadian federal election
Women MLAs in Alberta
20th-century Canadian women politicians
Liberal Party of Canada candidates for the Canadian House of Commons
Year of birth missing (living people)